Deadshot (Floyd Lawton) is  a supervillain and antihero appearing in American comic books published by DC Comics. Created by David Vern Reed, Lew Schwartz and Bob Kane, the character made his first appearance in Batman #59 (June–July 1950). The character was modernized with the popular look he is now known for in Detective Comics #474 by Steve Englehart, Marshall Rogers and Terry Austin. He is an excellent sniper who regularly boasts of never missing a shot, and is often considered one of the deadliest assassins in the DC Universe. Deadshot is primarily an adversary of the superhero Batman and belongs to the collection of enemies that make up his rogues gallery, though he has also come into conflict with other heroes, such as Green Arrow. While typically portrayed as a supervillain, he has also been occasionally depicted as an antihero.

The character has been substantially adapted from the comics into various forms of media, including television series, feature films and video games. Years after a one-off appearance, Deadshot became a recurring popular Batman villain following Detective Comics #474 and eventually joined the Suicide Squad. Deadshot was portrayed by Bradley Stryker in the final season of Smallville, by Michael Rowe in the Arrowverse, and by Will Smith in the DC Extended Universe, starting with the 2016 film, Suicide Squad. IGN ranked Deadshot as the 43rd-greatest comic book villain of all time in 2009.

Fictional character biography

Deadshot is often a hired assassin, regularly boasting to "Never Miss". He is capable of using a large variety of weapons, but is most frequently portrayed as using a pair of suppressed, wrist-mounted guns. He initially appears in Gotham City as a new crime fighter, but is revealed to be an enemy of Batman when he attempts to replace the Dark Knight. He is sent to jail when Batman and Commissioner Gordon publicly expose his plot to become the king of Gotham's underworld. After breaking out of jail, Deadshot begins hiring his services out as an assassin. At this point, he changes his costume from the top hat and tails he previously wore to a red jumpsuit and distinctive metal face plate with a targeting device on the right side.

Deadshot's past is revealed in subsequent appearances. His real name is Floyd Lawton, and he grew up in a wealthy household with his mother, abusive father and older brother Eddie. Eddie was beloved by his parents and the other townspeople, while Floyd was a troubled child and despised by his parents; still, Floyd idolized his brother and always stood up for him during conflicts with the town's other children. Floyd's parents were the most powerful people in his town, but they were known to despise each other. Eventually Floyd's mother claimed his father had become "too abusive", prompting Floyd and Eddie to kill him. When Eddie attempted the kill, he shot his father's spine, crippling him. Floyd took a shot from his tree house but accidentally killed Eddie instead. From that moment on, Floyd swore to never miss another shot again.

Suicide Squad
Deadshot has been a major figure in the Suicide Squad in many of its incarnations, where his skills as a marksman and his disregard for human life serve to advance the group's objectives.

One of his most defining traits is a desire to die in a spectacular fashion, this being his primary motivation for joining the Suicide Squad. He feels he has no reason to continue living, and, while he does not want to commit suicide, he simply does not care if he dies. Various reasons have been cited for this, but the most common thread in them is his parents' peculiar hatred for one another.

Deadshot almost gets his wish to die when he confronts a Senator who is threatening to expose the Suicide Squad to the world. Having been ordered to stop his immediate superior, Rick Flag, from assassinating the senator, he kills the senator himself, citing his orders as "Stop Flag from killing the Senator. Exact words". After this Deadshot is gunned down by the police on the steps of the Lincoln Memorial. He survives his wounds, to continue on with the Squad.

Lawton's uniform is stolen by an airport employee, who uses it to commit crimes and murders. Lawton is forced to kill the man with a bullet to the head. The shooting of his own "image" affects him greatly; for a while, he does not even fix the hole in his own uniform. While the suit has been lost, Lawton has threatened to kill the man he thought had been responsible, his teammate Captain Boomerang.

During a mission for the Suicide Squad, Count Vertigo asks Deadshot if he would kill him if asked. Deadshot agrees and the two go off to a secluded area for the decision. Vertigo declines, a decision Deadshot accepts with no argument.

After being affected by the supernatural entity Neron during the Underworld Unleashed storyline, Deadshot decides to kill a kindergarten class via a large explosion. An incarnation of the Justice League stops him. Around this time, Deadshot travels overseas to kill the Pope. Wonder Woman stops him at the last minute.

After dozens of villains are infected by the Joker venom, Deadshot, Merlyn and Deadline attack the Iron Heights metahuman prison. Deadline is killed and Deadshot rescues Captain Boomerang from medical confinement.

Children
Deadshot had a son named Edward "Eddie" Lawton who appeared in the 1988 Deadshot series. Eddie was sodomized and killed by Wes Anselm, a member of the gang hired by Deadshot's mother to blackmail her son into finally killing his hated father. In retaliation, Deadshot crippled her spine. In a second miniseries released in 2005, Deadshot discovers he has a daughter, Zoe, who is being raised in a crime-filled area of Star City. Lawton decides to do right by his daughter, and embarks on a lethal war on the local gangs that plague the area. The series ends with Deadshot faking his death, having realized a normal life is not for him, but also having mostly cleared up the area and convincing Green Arrow to patrol it more regularly.

In the New 52 continuity of Suicide Squad, there is a Japanese girl named Suchin Lawton who is revealed to be Deadshot's daughter, though little else is revealed.

Secret Six
During the 2005–2006 "Infinite Crisis" storyline, Deadshot is featured in the series Villains United. The Secret Six are banded together by a mysterious, shrouded character named Mockingbird (who is actually Lex Luthor) who offers a major reward for committing to the team and a severe punishment for not accepting membership. Deadshot is offered the reward of ruling North America; his punishment is to be the destruction of the neighborhood in which his daughter and his daughter's mother live. At the end of the miniseries, the conflict ends in stalemate and Deadshot's status remains roughly unchanged from the end of his second miniseries. He remains a part of The Secret Six and is shown having reached a grudging friendship with another member, Catman. His share of the payment for the Six's mercenary work is stated to be sent in its entirety to his daughter and her mother. After the Six disband, Knockout comments in passing that he has returned to the Suicide Squad.

Countdown
Deadshot and the Suicide Squad are featured in Countdown, rounding up supervillains for removal. The group encounters Pied Piper and Trickster several times, and each time fail to capture them. In Countdown to Final Crisis #24 Deadshot makes a solo effort to capture them, but the pair again elude him. In issue 22, Deadshot (breaking orders from Amanda Waller and Suicide Squad protocol) attacks Piper and Trickster on a train outside of the Rocky Mountains. Given that the supervillains are aware of Project Salvation (Salvation Run), Deadshot apparently kills The Trickster, leaving Pied Piper on his own. In Salvation Run #2, Deadshot is tricked and sent off to the prison planet along with the last batch of criminals. Rick Flag, Jr. tells him as the Boom tube closes that he cannot have people like him on Earth. Deadshot vows that if he ever returns to Earth, he would take his revenge on Flag. After helping fight off the Parademon invasion, he escapes with the surviving villains in the teleportation machine.

Batman: Cacophony
In Batman: Cacophony, Deadshot is seen breaking into Arkham Asylum. He goes to the Joker's cell and explains that he has taken a contract on the Joker's life, due to his indirect responsibility for the death of a high school student. Just as he is about to kill the Joker, however, Onomatopoeia arrives and engages Deadshot in a shootout. Eventually, Onomatopoeia gains the upper hand and shoots Deadshot in the head.

It is later revealed that Deadshot's armor saves him, and masks his vital signs to make it appear that he had been killed. He explains what happened at Arkham to Batman, before being turned over to the Gotham Police. Batman uses the technology of Lawton's mask to later survive an encounter with the Joker and Onomatopoeia.

Secret Six volume 2
Deadshot, along with Scandal Savage, Bane, Rag Doll and Catman reunite the Secret Six, having been hired to retrieve Tarantula from Alcatraz Island, and find a card which she stole from Junior, a mysterious villain who supposedly runs the entire West Coast mob. Junior has practically the entire villain community at her beck and call, all afraid of her, even those in Arkham Asylum. The Six later learn that the card in question was made by Neron, and says "Get Out Of Hell Free."

Soon, the Six are attacked by a small army of super-villains, all wanting to recover the card and collect the reward of $20 million for each of the Six, under the orders of Junior, who captures and tortures Bane, whose strong principles and moral convictions, paired with his fatherly fondness of Scandal keep him from betraying his new team. It is later revealed that Junior is in fact Rag Doll's sister and daughter of the first Rag Doll. She has the ghastly appearance of an old clown, with sliced skin and eyes stitched wide open to give the appearance of a clown.

The Six escape, and head for Gotham City, with Deadshot seemingly betraying them and leaving with Tarantula. The Six manage to catch up to Deadshot, only to be attacked by Junior and the Super villains, and the Mad Hatter, who is revealed to be the one who hired them, simply so they would be killed. Tarantula sacrifices herself by pulling herself and Junior in front of the Super villains' combined attack, seemingly destroying the card along with them. However, it is later shown that Scandal is now in possession of the card.

The Suicide Squad re-enter Deadshot's life when the title returned in January 2010 as a tie-in to the "Blackest Night" storyline.

While on a mission to Gotham City to kill several of Batman's allies, Rag Doll insinuates that Deadshot and Catman are friends despite their protestations, something they grudgingly acknowledge. Before this plot thread can be pursued further, the Six are ambushed by an army of superheroes who had come to assist Batman. Deadshot and the rest of the team choose to fight the heroes despite the overwhelming odds, and Deadshot manages to take down Doctor Light before being blasted and rendered unconscious by Green Lantern. The rest of the Six are similarly trounced and defeated soon after.

The New 52

In The New 52 (a 2011 reboot of the DC Comics universe), Deadshot is recruited to the Suicide Squad prior to the events of the first issue. He still has a daughter and wears a costume similar to the one he wore in the 2000s miniseries, but his son has been erased from continuity. In addition, Deadshot no longer has his trademark mustache (though he briefly regrows it to cover a scar in issue #13). He is portrayed as a Batman villain and a rival of Mad Dog, a bounty hunter. He also is bitter enemies with Captain Boomerang.

Deadshot is arrested for a failed assassination of a U.S. Senator by Batman and was sentenced to life in prison. Later, he is recruited to be part of the Suicide Squad in exchange for early release. Deadshot is made team leader due to his skill under pressure, but quickly grows disillusioned with the group after a planned visit with his daughter, his first since his arrest, is withheld from him and ultimately aborted within minutes of him reuniting with his daughter to send him on a mission.

Deadshot ultimately sacrifices his life to kill the evil cult member Regulas, who had brainwashed most of the members of Suicide Squad and had recruited Black Spider into his group Basilisk to assassinate Amanda Waller. Deadshot is later revealed to have been resurrected, possibly through use of an arm from Resurrection Man, obtained by the Squad for Waller during an earlier mission.

During the 2013–2014 "Forever Evil" story line, Amanda Waller contacts Deadshot to help her get the Suicide Squad back together after the three Justice League teams are "dead." After his money was wired, Deadshot heads out to get Harley Quinn back on the team.

DC Rebirth

During the War of Jokes and Riddles, a story taking place in the early days of Batman's career, Deadshot sided with the Joker. Deadshot engaged Deathstroke, who sided with the Riddler, in a battle that took over 5 days, killing multiple victims. Eventually Batman put a stop to it and gave both a swift defeat. Deadshot suffered severe head trauma and was hospitalized.

Deadshot remained a stalwart of the Suicide Squad throughout. However, he was finally killed by Black Mask on an operation that soon fell apart.

Powers and abilities
Deadshot has no superhuman powers but is the top marksman in the DC Universe. He possesses superhuman-like accuracy, and regularly boasts that he "never misses" his target. Deadshot once shot an apple off of Captain Boomerang's head with his eyes closed. He also intentionally grazed the skull of Enchantress while she was flying, since he was asked to take her down non-lethally. He is so skilled that he can make his shots ricochet from structures and kill multiple targets at the same time. He can even shoot around corners. Deadshot is also a tactical genius and master strategist and is also a highly skilled demolitions expert.

Deadshot has access to a vast array of weaponry, most notably, his sniper rifle and twin machine guns mounted on each arm. Deadshot is allegedly bilingual, and learned to speak Russian as a youth. He also claims to have been a Card-carrying Communist.

Deadshot has proven to be a formidable hand-to-hand combatant when needed due to his excellent physical condition and training as an assassin. He has gone toe-to-toe against Batman on several occasions and has also fought Deathstroke to a standstill. He is adept in Karate, Jiu-Jitsu, Judo, Boxing, Krav Maga and Muay Thai. He is also an expert in many different styles of knife fighting. Lawton also possesses advanced knowledge of the human anatomy and knows all the weak spots and pressure points of the human body.

Personality

Deadshot is portrayed as a consummate professional; as long as he has been paid to kill someone, he will always carry it out, without exceptions. Batman was unable to get him to stop threatening a witness by threatening Deadshot or his family; Deadshot rightly assumed that Batman was bluffing. However, Batman ultimately does get Deadshot to abort the hit by freezing his client's bank accounts. Unable to get paid, Deadshot publicly cancelled the assassination, letting the witness go free.

Perhaps his most defining trait is his acknowledged death wish, which often manifests as him deliberately engineering situations likely to kill him. This makes him unpredictable as an opponent, as his willingness to die allows him to deliberately injure himself to achieve a goal. For example, during Identity Crisis, he deliberately shoots himself in the neck while fighting Kyle Rayner, so that Rayner would attempt to save him and drop his guard, allowing Lawton to take aim and almost shoot him. He often expresses disappointment at surviving his missions, such as immediately lamenting "damn" when awakening in a hospital.

In his run on Suicide Squad, John Ostrander delved into Deadshot's past and family background. The revelation of Deadshot having a brother, whom he idolized, seemed to resonate with Deadshot's attachment to Rick Flag, team leader. Ostrander implied that this relationship also colored Deadshot's rivalry with Batman, whom Deadshot had always been unable—or subconsciously unwilling—to kill.

He is known to be sarcastic and profane, often cursing whenever frustrated or angered.

Collected editions

Other versions

Amalgam Comics
In the Amalgam Comics universe, Deadshot was combined with the Marvel villain Bullseye to create the assassin Deadeye. William Lawton appears as an enemy of Dare the Terminator and Catsai.

Batman: Sins of the Father
Deadshot appears as the main antagonist of the tie-in digital comic taking place between the video games Batman: The Telltale Series and Batman: The Enemy Within. Hailing from a family of wealthy real-estate tycoons, Floyd witnessed his older brother killed by his abusive parents when he was a child and later murdered them when he was fourteen while setting it up to make it look like they killed themselves. Inheriting his family's wealth, he quits the real-estate business and becomes a military contractor, giving him access to a large arsenal of weapons.

Lawton later discovers that despite his parents being sent to Arkham Asylum on accounts of child abuse before his brother's death, they were not committed to the prison as their doctor, Thomas Wayne, agreed to keep them out of the asylum as long as they give him a large discount on a building that would eventually become Wayne Tower. After the revelations of Thomas Wayne's corrupt nature were brought to the public in the first game, Lawton becomes Deadshot and uses his expert marksmanship to hunt down the Arkham staff that were working at the asylum during the time period that Thomas operated.

Bruce talks to Lawton in person in hopes of getting Deadshot to target him instead of the Arkham staff, but he antagonizes Lawton to the point where he decides to go after those close to Bruce instead. While Bruce manages to save Lucius Fox and Commissioner Gordon, Deadshot kidnaps Alfred with the rest of the Arkham staff and attaches explosives to each of them. He gives Batman a gun and forces the vigilante to decide between shooting him or letting the hostages die to prove to Gotham that true heroes do not exist. Batman instead shoots the detonator and defeats Deadshot as Alfred frees the rest of the hostages. Lawton is sent to Arkham Asylum after his lawyer argued for his untreated PTSD, where a shadowed figure offers him a spot in the Suicide Squad.

Futures End
Set in a near alternate future of the New 52, Lawton is imprisoned in an underground Belle Reeve missing his shooting arm. He, and the future Black Manta and Harley Quinn are broken out by Amanda Waller, who informs them that they were imprisoned and forgotten as the government found a way to clone super villains and Suicide Squad members in Texas. After Harley and Manta are killed by Joker clones, Deadshot allows Waller time by taking on a Deathstroke clone in a sword fight. Despite his disadvantages, Deadshot defeats the clone and sacrifices his life in the process. Deadshot's actions allowed Waller to break into the main hub and stop the cloning.

Tiny Titans
Deadshot makes a cameo in the Tiny Titans series as a player on Lobo's soccer team, the Secret Six.

Zoe Lawton
Zoe Lawton was created by Christos N Gage and Steven Cummings. She made her first appearance in Deadshot #1.
The daughter of Michelle Torres and Deadshot, Zoe was conceived following a casual liaison. Her mother gave up prostitution and drugs for Zoe's sake and moved them to a poor neighborhood in Star City, where she was raised for four years without her father's knowledge.

Major Story Arcs

Urban Renewal
Zoe and her mother are approached by Deadshot who has recently learned of her existence. She is babysat by Deadshot, with whom she bonds. Later, when Deadshot is forced to leave the family for their protection, she is granted admittance to a good school thanks to her father's connections.

Six Degrees of Devastation
Spending time with her father and mother in a park, Zoe is present when they are suddenly attacked by Lady Vic and Double Dare. She and her mother are allowed to flee by the assassins, but return to assist Deadshot. She is the reason Deadshot does not kill any of his assailants. Later, she is present when her father calls her mother and informs her that he will never see them again, for their own safety.

Powers and Abilities
Zoe is an ordinary human child and has no known superhuman powers or abilities.

Zoe Lawton in other media
 Zoe makes a non-speaking cameo appearance at the end of Batman: Assault on Arkham. 
 Zoe appears in flashbacks depicted in the Arrow episode "Suicidal Tendencies", portrayed by Audrey Wise Alvarez. This version is Deadshot's legitimate daughter with Susan Lawton. 
 Zoe appears as a minor supporting character in Suicide Squad, portrayed by Shailyn Pierre-Dixon.
 Zoe makes a non-speaking cameo appearance in Suicide Squad: Hell to Pay.
 Zoe appears in Deadshot's ending in Injustice 2.

In other media

Television

Animation
 Deadshot appears in series set in the DC Animated Universe (DCAU), voiced by Michael Rosenbaum.
 After making minor appearances in Justice League, he returns in the sequel series Justice League Unlimited episode "Task Force X", in which he is recruited by Project Cadmus to join the eponymous team in stealing the Annihilator automaton from the Justice League's Watchtower.
 Additionally, Deadshot was considered to appear in preceding series The New Batman Adventures, but was ultimately cut.
 Deadshot appears in the Batman: The Brave and the Bold episode "Night of the Batmen!", voiced by Tom Kenny.
 Deadshot appears in Justice League Action, voiced by Christian Slater. This version wields futuristic weaponry.
 Deadshot makes a non-speaking cameo appearance in the Harley Quinn episode "Til Death Do Us Part".

Live-action
 Deadshot appears in the tenth season of Smallville, portrayed by Bradley Stryker. This version is a member of the Suicide Squad who wears western/steampunk-inspired attire and sports long hair.
 Floyd Lawton / Deadshot appears in TV series set in the Arrowverse, portrayed by Michael Rowe.
 Primarily appearing in Arrow, this version is a former soldier who became estranged from his wife and daughter due to suffering from post-traumatic stress disorder. Introduced in the first season, he is hired by several individuals to kill various targets in Starling City, but runs afoul of John Diggle, who holds a grudge against him for killing the former's brother Andy, A.R.G.U.S., and the "Hood", who takes out one of Lawton's eyes, which Lawton replaces with a cybernetic prosthetic he received from China White. In the second season, Diggle and A.R.G.U.S. agent Lyla Michaels break Lawton out of a Russian prison so A.R.G.U.S. can recruit him into their Suicide Squad. In the third season episode "Suicidal Tendencies", the squad is sent to Kasnia to rescue hostages and U.S. senator Joseph Cray from terrorists. After the mission is revealed to be a ruse orchestrated by Cray, Lawton seemingly sacrifices himself to help the rest of the group escape and is presumed dead, though Diggle later states that his body was never recovered. Series co-developer Marc Guggenheim confirmed that Lawton had been pulled from the series after news broke that the character would appear in the DC Extended Universe film Suicide Squad. Despite this, Diggle suffers a hallucination of Lawton in the fifth season episode "A Matter of Trust".
 An Earth-2 incarnation of Lawton appears in The Flash episode "Welcome to Earth-2". This version is a heroic yet bumbling officer of the Central City Police Department who ironically gained the nickname "Deadshot" for his poor marksmanship.

Film

Animation
 Deadshot appears in a self-titled segment of Batman: Gotham Knight, voiced by Jim Meskimen. Similar to his original comic book appearances, this version dresses in an elegant fashion and displays a fear of death.
 Deadshot makes a non-speaking cameo appearance in Superman/Batman: Public Enemies.
 Deadshot appears in Batman: Assault on Arkham, voiced by Neal McDonough. This version is a veteran member and leader of Amanda Waller's Suicide Squad who had a one-night stand with teammate Harley Quinn, displays a rivalry with Captain Boomerang, and intends to reunite with his daughter, Zoe Lawton.
 Deadshot appears in Suicide Squad: Hell to Pay, voiced again by Christian Slater. This version is the leader of Amanda Waller's Suicide Squad who seeks to reunite with his estranged daughter Zoe Lawton.
 Deadshot makes a non-speaking cameo appearance in Injustice.

Live-action
 Floyd Lawton / Deadshot appears in the DC Extended Universe (DCEU) film Suicide Squad, portrayed by Will Smith. This version is African-American and reputed to be the "most wanted hitman in the world". After being apprehended by Batman prior to the film and incarcerated in Belle Reve Penitentiary, Lawton is blackmailed by Amanda Waller into joining Task Force X, which he derisively refers to as a "Suicide Squad". After helping the squad defeat the Enchantress, Lawton is allowed supervised visits with his daughter Zoe in addition to having ten years removed from his sentence.
 While it was reported that Idris Elba would replace Smith as Lawton in the DCEU film The Suicide Squad due to scheduling conflicts, it was later decided that Elba would portray Robert DuBois / Bloodsport instead, leaving the door open for Smith to return.

Video games
 Deadshot appears in Batman: The Video Game.
 Deadshot appears as a background non-player character (NPC) in Injustice: Gods Among Us as part of the Stryker's Island stage. Additionally, the DCEU incarnation appears as a playable character in the mobile version.
 Deadshot appears as a playable character in Suicide Squad: Special Ops.
 Deadshot appears as a playable character in Injustice 2, voiced by Matthew Mercer. This version is a reluctant member of Gorilla Grodd's Society, having been forced to join after Grodd acquired the detonator for the nano-bomb in Deadshot's head. In his non-canonical arcade mode ending, Deadshot defeats Grodd and Brainiac before handing them over to the authorities. In return, his prison sentence is annulled and Bruce Wayne funds an operation to remove the nano-explosive, allowing Deadshot a second chance at being a father to his daughter, Zoe.

Lego
 Deadshot appears as an unlockable character in the Nintendo 3DS and PlayStation Vita versions of Lego Batman 2: DC Super Heroes.
 Deadshot appears as a playable character in Lego Batman 3: Beyond Gotham, voiced by Robin Atkin Downes.
 Deadshot appears in Lego DC Super-Villains, voiced again by Matthew Mercer. This version is a member of the Legion of Doom.

Batman: Arkham
Two incarnations of Deadshot appear in the Batman: Arkham franchise.
 The first incarnation of Deadshot appears as a boss in Batman: Arkham City, voiced by Chris Cox. In the beginning of the story mode and as part of a side mission, he infiltrates the titular prison to assassinate political prisoners connected to the warden, Hugo Strange, as well as Bruce Wayne and Batman. After investigating three of his assassinations, Batman tracks down and defeats Deadshot before imprisoning him in a defunct carriage.
 A young Deadshot appears as a boss in Batman: Arkham Origins. After being hired by the Joker disguised as Black Mask to kill Batman, Deadshot and his men take hostages at the Gotham Merchants Bank, but are ultimately defeated by Batman.
 A young Deadshot appears in Batman: Arkham Origins Blackgate. Having been incarcerated at Blackgate Penitentiary, he escapes during a prison riot and is hired separately by the Joker, Black Mask, and Penguin to kill Batman, but is defeated once more. Following this, Amanda Waller recruits Deadshot into the Suicide Squad.
 The second incarnation of Deadshot will appear as a playable character in Suicide Squad: Kill the Justice League, voiced by Bumper Robinson. This version is an African-American who killed the original version and stole his equipment, claiming the latter was an impostor.

Miscellaneous
 Deadshot appears in the Young Justice tie-in comic book.
 The Arrowverse incarnation of Deadshot appears in the Arrow tie-in comic book of the same name, the non-canonical tie-in comic Arrow: Season 2.5, and The Flash: Season Zero, with the last two seeing him continuing to work for A.R.G.U.S.'s Suicide Squad.
 The first Batman: Arkham incarnation of Deadshot appears in the Batman: Arkham Knight prequel comic book as a member of Harley Quinn's Suicide Squad. While on a mission for Amanda Waller, Deadshot saves Batman from Killer Croc and temporarily joins forces with him to investigate Simon Stagg's "Project: Meta" before attempting to betray him, only to be foiled and arrested by Commissioner James Gordon, though Waller helps Deadshot escape GCPD custody.

See also
List of Batman family enemies
Bullseye, a similar assassin from Marvel Comics

References

External links
Deadshot at DC Comics' official website
Deadshot on the DCUniverse Guide

Action film villains
Batman characters
Villains in animated television series
Characters created by Bob Kane
Comics characters introduced in 1950
DC Comics film characters
DC Comics male supervillains
DC Comics martial artists
DC Comics military personnel
DC Comics titles
Fictional amputees
Fictional assassins in comics
Fictional contract killers
Fictional gunfighters in comics
Fictional marksmen and snipers
Fictional mass murderers
Fictional mercenaries in comics
Fictional United States Army personnel
Fighting game characters
Golden Age supervillains
Video game bosses
Suicide Squad members
Superhero television characters
Supervillains with their own comic book titles